Gorno Egri is an abandoned village in the Bitola Municipality of North Macedonia. It used to be part of the former municipality of Bistrica.

Demographics
In statistics gathered by Vasil Kanchov in 1900, the village of Gorno Egri was inhabited by 70 Christian Bulgarians and 50 Muslim Albanians. 
According to the 2002 census, the village had a total of 0 inhabitants. Ethnic groups in the village include:

References

External links
 Visit Macedonia

Villages in Bitola Municipality